Sergio Canales Madrazo (born 16 February 1991) is a Spanish professional footballer who plays as an attacking midfielder for La Liga club Real Betis and the Spain national team.

After starting out at Racing de Santander, he signed as a 19-year-old with Real Madrid for €4.5 million, but failed to reproduce his form at the latter club and left after only one season. He went on to represent, always in La Liga, Valencia, Real Sociedad and Betis.

Canales earned 39 caps for Spain at youth level, winning the 2013 European Championship with the under-21 team. He made his debut for the senior squad in 2019.

Club career

Racing Santander
Born in Santander, Cantabria, Canales was a product of hometown Racing de Santander's youth ranks. In 2006, 50% of his playing rights were bought by Deportivo de La Coruña as part of the deal that saw Pedro Munitis return to Racing with Dudu Aouate and Antonio Tomás moving in the opposite direction.

Canales made his first-team debut on 18 September 2008, playing in a UEFA Cup home tie against FC Honka of Finland, a 1–0 win. Roughly two weeks later he first appeared in La Liga, with the same result happening at CA Osasuna.

Having gradually received more playing time with the main squad, Canales scored twice against RCD Espanyol in a 4–0 away win on 6 December 2009, and repeated the feat at Sevilla FC on 9 January 2010 (2–1 at the Ramón Sánchez Pizjuán Stadium), receiving Player of the match honors in the latter game. The following week, as Racing drew at home to Real Valladolid 1–1, he also found the net, and eventually finished his first full season with six goals and four assists to help his team narrowly avoid relegation.

Real Madrid
On 12 February 2010, Real Madrid announced the signing of Canales on a six-year deal for a fee believed to be around €4.5 million plus incentives. He made his debut on 4 August, scoring a goal in a 3–2 friendly win over Club América. His first league appearance came on 29 August, in a 0–0 draw against RCD Mallorca.

Canales totalled 518 minutes of action in his only year with the club, which included three appearances in the victorious run in the Copa del Rey.

Valencia
On 4 August 2011, Valencia announced Canales would join the club on a two-year loan. After that time, they retained the option of purchasing the player whilst Real Madrid had the possibility of recalling him during that timeframe.

Canales scored his first goal for his new side on 1 October, the game's only in a home fixture against Granada CF. Late into the month, he had to be stretchered off during a league home match against Athletic Bilbao and, the following day, he was diagnosed with a torn knee ligament, being sidelined for six months.

On 26 April 2012, in only his fifth appearance since returning, against Atlético Madrid in the Europa League semifinals' second leg, Canales relapsed from his injury early into the second half of an eventual 0–1 home loss (5–2 aggregate defeat), going on to miss a further six months of action.

On 19 July 2012, Canales moved permanently to Valencia for €7.5 million and five years, alongside Madrid teammate Fernando Gago. The latter also reserved an option to buy back the player during the next two seasons.

Real Sociedad
Canales was deemed surplus to requirements after the arrival of new Valencia coach Juan Antonio Pizzi, in December 2013. In late January of the following year, he signed for four and a half years and €3.5 million with fellow league side Real Sociedad.

Canales scored four goals from 36 appearances in his first full season, as the Txuriurdin finished in 12th position. On 30 December 2015, however, during the first half of a match at former club Real Madrid, he suffered another serious knee injury, now in the left leg.

On 24 May 2018, Real Sociedad confirmed that Canales would be leaving the Anoeta Stadium on 30 June.

Betis
On 3 July 2018, free agent Canales signed a four-year contract with Real Betis. In the 2020–21 campaign, he scored a career-best eight goals.

International career
In 2008, Canales helped Spain's under-17 team win the UEFA European Championship in Turkey. At age 19 he made his under-21 debut, scoring twice in his first two games.

Subsequently, Canales was named in the squad for the 2009 European Under-19 Championship. The following year, in the same category, he represented the nation at the European Championships, reaching the final and scoring one goal in the semi-finals, a 3–1 win over England.

Canales was selected to the 2011 FIFA U-20 World Cup in Colombia, playing four out of five games for the national team (three starts) in an eventual penalty shootout quarter-final exit. He featured regularly in the 2013 European Championship Under-21 qualification where he netted three times, including a brace against Georgia; despite missing the playoff game with Denmark he was named in the squad for the finals in Israel, but withdrew from the tournament after picking an injury in the first group match against Russia– Spain went on to win the trophy.

On 15 March 2019, Canales was called up by full side manager Luis Enrique for two UEFA Euro 2020 qualifying matches against Norway and Malta. He made his debut eight days later, as a 74th-minute substitute for Dani Ceballos in the 2–1 victory over the former in Valencia.

Canales scored his first goal on 11 November 2020, opening the 1–1 friendly draw with the Netherlands in Amsterdam.

Personal life
Canales' second cousin, Borja Docal, was also a footballer.

Career statistics

Club

International

 Spain score listed first, score column indicates score after each Canales goal.

Honours
Real Madrid
Copa del Rey: 2010–11

Betis
Copa del Rey: 2021–22

Spain U17
UEFA European Under-17 Championship: 2008

Spain U19
UEFA European Under-19 Championship runner-up: 2010

Spain U21
UEFA European Under-21 Championship: 2013

Individual
UEFA La Liga Team of The Season: 2018–19
La Liga Team of the Season: 2021–22

Notes

References

External links

Real Sociedad official profile

CiberChe biography and stats 

1991 births
Living people
Spanish footballers
Footballers from Santander, Spain
Association football midfielders
La Liga players
Segunda División B players
Rayo Cantabria players
Racing de Santander players
Real Madrid CF players
Valencia CF players
Real Sociedad footballers
Real Betis players
Spain youth international footballers
Spain under-21 international footballers
Spain international footballers